Peter Sharp (11 August 1939 – 18 February 2012) was a New Zealand cricketer. An off spinner, Sharp played eight first-class cricket matches for Canterbury between 1964 and 1966.

After his cricket career Sharp was at various times a selector for Canterbury, president of Cricket Canterbury and a board member of New Zealand Cricket. 

Sharp also worked for 45 years as a cricket commentator for the now disbanded Radio Sport.

From 1956 Southland Boys' High School Old Boys Register: At School 1953-56. 1st XI, 1955-56. 1st XI (soccer), 1956. Senior fives champion (doubles), 1956. Prefect, 1956. R.S.M., 1956.

References

External links

1939 births
2012 deaths
New Zealand cricketers
Cricketers from Christchurch
Deaths from cancer in New Zealand
Canterbury cricketers
New Zealand cricket commentators